Msheirfeh  is a Syrian village located in Abu al-Duhur Nahiyah in Idlib District, Idlib.  According to the Central Bureau of Statistics (CBS), it had a population of 287 in the 2004 census.

References 

Populated places in Idlib District